Enteromius validus is a species of ray-finned fish in the  family Cyprinidae. It is endemic to the Democratic Republic of the Congo where it inhabits the N’sele River and Mayi Ndombe River in the Congo River basin.
Its natural habitat is freshwater marshes.

References

Enteromius
Taxa named by Melanie Stiassny
Fish described in 2016
Endemic fauna of the Democratic Republic of the Congo